Hugh Munro, 9th Baron of Foulis was a 14th – 15th century Scottish soldier and said to be 12th chief of the Clan Munro in the Scottish Highlands. Hugh was seated at Foulis Castle in Ross-shire, Scotland. Although Hugh is traditionally the 9th Baron and 12th overall chief of the clan, he is only the 2nd Munro chief that can be proved by contemporary evidence.

Lands and Charters

Hugh Munro was the eldest son of Robert de Munro, 8th Baron of Foulis (d.1369). Upon his father's death Hugh succeeded as chief of the clan and he was granted from his cousin, Uilleam III, Earl of Ross, charters for the lands of Katewell and the Tower of Badgarvie in the parish of Kiltearn. The following year in 1370 Hugh was granted more lands from the same Earl including Inverlael in Loch Broom, Kilmachalmack in Strath-Oykel, Carbisdale in Strathcarron, lands in the parish of Kincardine, Sutherland and was also reserved the salmon fishing in the Kyle of Oykel for himself and his heirs.

In 1379 Euphemia I, Countess of Ross confirmed the lands of Contullich and the Tower of Ardoch (Contullich Castle) to her cousin Hugh Munro of Foulis and in 1394 she granted Hugh two charters, one in respect of the "Tower of Strathschech" and "Wesstir Fowlys".

Harlaw and the Lord of the Isles

In 1411 Hugh Munro, 9th Baron of Foulis joined Domhnall of Islay, Lord of the Isles the chief of Clan Donald in contest with Robert Stewart, Duke of Albany and Alexander Stewart, Earl of Mar for the Earldom of Ross. This resulted in the Battle of Harlaw. The Munros fought in the Lord of the Isles 'host' against an army of Scottish Lowlanders led by the Duke of Albany who was temporarily prevented from gaining power in Ross-shire.

The result of the battle has been a matter of argument amongst many historians. Some have said that Donald and the Highlanders had victory as the Duke of Albany did not return to the Highlands for four years until 1415. Others say that Donald failed to inflict a decisive victory because he withdrew back to the western highlands. The battle seems to have been indecisive for both sides. In 1415 the Earldom of Ross was resigned to the Duke of Albany who in turn awarded it to his son the John Stewart, 2nd Earl of Buchan. However it would pass to the Lord of the Isles within a generation.

Family

Hugh Munro, 9th Baron of Foulis married Isabelle Keith daughter of William Keith, 1st Earl Marischal, also known as the Great Marishchal of Scotland. They had 4 children:

George Munro, 10th Baron of Foulis. Hugh's heir and successor as chief of the Clan Munro.
John Munro, 1st of Milntown. Progenitor of the Munro of Milntown branch of the clan.
Janet Munro. Married Malcolm Og MacKintosh, a cadet of the MacKintoshes of Dunachton, Clan Mackintosh.
Elizabeth Munro. Married Neil MacKay, 8th chief of the Clan MacKay.

Hugh Munro died in 1425 and was buried at Chanonry. In the years following Hugh's death, during the chieftainship of his eldest son George Munro, King James I of Scotland returned from captivity in England and took strong measures to restore order in the Highlands. He came to Inverness in 1427 and seized Mary, Countess of Ross and her son Alexander MacDonald, Lord of the Isles as well as many other prominent highlanders who were punished in various ways. Among these no Munros are named. However, there is a "letter of remission", signed under the Great Seal dated 24 August 1428. In the letter twenty eight named individuals are freed for crimes they had committed in the past and the first five names on the list are all Munros.

References

People from Ross and Cromarty
1425 deaths
Hugh Munro, 9th Baron of Foulis
Year of birth unknown